Carrie Kabak is an author and production designer. Born and raised in the United Kingdom, she now lives in Missouri.

Her first book, Cover the Butter, won an AudioFile Earphones Award in 2006. It was reviewed by Publishers Weekly, Booklist, Kirkus Reviews, and Library Journal.

Carrie Kabak Publications 

 Cover the Butter (2005), Dutton Adult
 For Keeps (Contributor), Seal Press
 He Said What? (Contributor)  Seal Press
 Exit Laughing (Contributor) North Atlantic Books

References

External links 
 Author's webpage

Living people
People from Bolton
Year of birth missing (living people)